Planet Records was an independent American record label founded in 1978 by record producer Richard Perry. It was distributed by Elektra/Asylum Records until 1982, when Perry sold it to RCA Records.

Label history

Beginnings
The label was founded in 1978 by Perry as a side vehicle for showcasing new talent he was nurturing while he was still producing existing artists for other labels.  The first act signed to the label was the Pointer Sisters, who became the label's biggest sellers.  Other acts on the label included Bill Medley, Greg Phillinganes, the Plimsouls and American Noise.

Acquisition by RCA Records
Perry sold Planet Records to RCA Records in 1982, which operated it as a subsidiary label through late 1985, when it was liquidated. After the demise of the label, records by the Pointer Sisters, Phillinganes and Medley all appeared on the RCA Victor label. The remaining artists on Planet's roster did not have their contracts renewed.

Artists
American Noise
The Cretones
Swing
Marva King
Bill Medley
Night
Greg Phillinganes
The Plimsouls
The Pointer Sisters
June Pointer
Sue Saad and the Next
Mark Saffan and the Keepers

Discography
P-1 - Energy - Pointer Sisters 
P-2 - Night - Night 
P-3 - Night - Night (reissue of P-2 with added track)
P-4 - Sue Saad and The Next - Sue Saad and The Next 
P-5 - Thin Red Line - The Cretones 
P-6 - Sharp Cuts: New Music from American Bands - Various Artists 
P-8 - American Noise - American Noise 
P-9 - Special Things - Pointer Sisters 
P-10 - Lond Distance - Night 
P-12 - Mark Saffan and The Keepers - Mark Saffan and The Keepers 
P-13 - The Plimsouls - The Plimsouls 
P-15 - Snap! Snap! - The Cretones 
P-16 - Feels Right - Marva King 
P-17 - Significant Gains - Greg Phillinganes 
P-18 - Black & White - Pointer Sisters 
P-24 - Swing - Swing 
P-9001 - The Champ (soundtrack) - Various Artists 
P-9002 - Voices (soundtrack) - Various Artists 
P-9003 - Priority - Pointer Sisters 
E1-60206 - Greatest Hits - Pointer Sisters 
BXL1-4355 - So Excited! - Pointer Sisters
BXL1-4426 - The Good Times Are Back - Full Swing 
BXL1-4434 - Right Here and Now - Bill Medley 
BXL1-4508 - Baby Sister - June Pointer 
BXL1-4698 - Pulse - Greg Phillinganes 
BXL1-4705 - Break Out - Pointer Sisters 
BXL1-4705A - Break Out - Pointer Sisters (reissue with a remix of "I'm So Excited" replacing "Nightline")

See also
List of record labels

References

External links 
 Planet album discography from BSN Pubs
 Planet Records at Discogs

American record labels
Record labels established in 1978
Record labels disestablished in 1985
Rock record labels
Pop record labels
Elektra Records
RCA Records